Takht District is a district (bakhsh) in Bandar Abbas County, Hormozgan Province, Iran. At the 2006 census, its population was 28,842, in 6,473 families.  The District has one city Takht. The District has two rural districts (dehestan): Shamil Rural District and Takht Rural District.

References 

Districts of Hormozgan Province
Bandar Abbas County